The Ecological-Left Liberal Democratic Party (German: Ökolinksliberale Demokratische Partei) short-form: ÖLDP, formerly known as the Social Liberal Democratic Party (Sozialliberale Demokratische Partei, SLDP), is a minor party in Germany primarily active in the Hamburger borough of Altona. The party was founded by the former SPD member Bérangère Bultheel in 2012.

Elections

Federal elections 
Bérangère Bultheel, the founder and leader of the ÖLDP, ran as an independent in the 2017 federal election where she received 320 votes (0.0%). The ÖLDP, under its new name, participated in the 2021 federal election in the constituency of Altona, where it received 159 constituency votes (0.1%).

State elections 
At the time known as the SLDP, the party took part in the 2020 Hamburg state election, where it received 653 votes (0.0%).

European elections 
The at-the-time SLDP applied to take part in the 2019 European elections but was denied due to not gaining enough signatures.

See also 
 Left liberalism
 Hamburg-Altona
 List of political parties in Germany
 Social Democratic Party of Germany

Weblinks 
 Official website of the ÖLDP (German)
 Bérangère Bultheel at the NDR candidate check for the Hamburg state election 2020 (German)

References 

Liberal parties in Germany
Green political parties in Germany
Pro-European political parties in Germany
Political parties in Germany
Social liberal parties
Anti-fascism in Germany
Organisations based in Hamburg